Görecek Island is an Aegean island of Turkey. The island is a part of Bodrum ilçe (district) of Muğla Province. It is quite close to the mainland (Anatolia) . The uninhabited island is a private property.

References

Aegean islands
Islands of Turkey
Islands of Muğla Province
Bodrum District